Wietrzychowice  is a village in the administrative district of Gmina Izbica Kujawska, within Włocławek County, Kuyavian-Pomeranian Voivodeship, in north-central Poland.

Archaeology
A group of megalithic tombs called Polish Pyramids or Kuyavian Pyramids have been found in the adjacent forest.

References

Villages in Włocławek County
Archaeological sites in Poland